Genri Nikolaevich Koptev-Gomolov (Russian: Генри Николаевич Коптев-Гомолов; born 4 June 1926) is a Russian World War II veteran.

Koptev-Gomolov was born on 4 June 1926 in the town of Balashikha in the Moscow Oblast. Drafted into the army in 1943, got to the front in summer 1944. Served in the 1085th Rifle Regiment of the 322nd Rifle Division, commander of a 45 mm anti-tank gun. He destroyed a Nazi self-propelled gun during the liberation of Auschwitz, for which he received the Order of Glory 3rd class. Koptev-Gomolov was also awarded the Order of the Patriotic War 2nd class, and numerous medals.

References 

People from Balashikha
1926 births
Living people
Recipients of the Order of Glory
Soviet military personnel of World War II